

The Blériot 106 was a 1920s French cabin monoplane designed and built by Blériot Aéronautique. First flown on 15 July 1924 the 106 was a single-engined shoulder-wing monoplane powered by a  Renault 12Jb inline piston engine. The pilot sat in an open cockpit behind the engine and an enclosed cabin had room for six passengers.

Specifications

References

Notes

Bibliography

High-wing aircraft
Single-engined tractor aircraft
1920s French airliners
106
Aircraft first flown in 1924